Apateticus lineolatus is a species of predatory stink bug in the family Pentatomidae. It is found in Central America, North America, and South America.

References

Asopinae
Articles created by Qbugbot
Insects described in 1840